Cotta may refer to:

People
 Aurelia Cotta (120–54 BC), mother of Julius Caesar
 Bernhard von Cotta (1808–1879), German geologist
 Carloto Cotta (born 1984), Portuguese actor
 Elena Cotta (born 1931), Italian actress
 Gaius Aurelius Cotta, ancient Roman statesman and orator
 Heinrich Cotta (1763–1844), German silviculturist
 Johann Friedrich Cotta (1764–1832), German publisher, industrial pioneer, and politician
 Johann Friedrich Cotta (theologian) (1701–1779), German Lutheran theologian
 John Cotta (1575–1650), English physician
 Lucius Aurelius Cotta (consul 65 BC), ancient Roman senator
 Lucius Aurelius Cotta (consul 119 BC), Roman senator, military commander, and consul
 Lucius Aurelius Cotta (consul 144 BC), Roman magistrate, tribune, and consul
 Lucius Aurunculeius Cotta, officer in the Gallic army of Julius Caesar
 Marcus Aurelius Cotta (consul 74 BC), Roman politician and general
 Michèle Cotta (born 1937), French political journalist
 Myron Joseph Cotta (born 1953), American Catholic bishop

Other uses
 Ancient Roman town in Morocco
 A surplice, an ecclesiastical garment (in Medieval Latin and Italian)
 A lightweight underdress in Italian 15th-century fashion (cf. cotte)
 Cotta (moth), a moth of the family Geometridae
 Cotta Sandstone, a type of stone found in the Elbe Valley

See also
 Dresden-Cotta railway station, Germany
 Kata (disambiguation)
 Terra Cotta (disambiguation)